Hylesiopsis is a genus of moths in the family Saturniidae first described by Eugène Louis Bouvier in 1929. It is monotypic, being represented by the single species Hylesiopsis festiva.

References

Hemileucinae
Taxa named by Eugène Louis Bouvier